Yanbei Subdistrict is a subdistrict in Yong'an, Fujian, China. , it administers the following four residential neighborhoods and six villages:
Neighborhoods
Huangshan
Houxiyang
Hongbin
Hongshan

Villages
Xikeng Village
Xiying Village
Xingping Village
Banwei Village
Yikou Village
Feiqiao Village

See also 
 List of township-level divisions of Fujian

References 

Township-level divisions of Fujian
Yong'an